Dire Straits were a British rock band.

Dire Straits may also refer to:

Dire Straits (album), the band's 1978 debut album
Dire Straits Tour, the band's 1978 debut tour

See also
The Three Weeks, or Bein haMetzarim  (Between the Straits), a period of mourning commemorating the destruction of the first and second Jewish Temples